The Kent Downs is an Area of Outstanding Natural Beauty (AONB) in Kent, England. They are the eastern half of the North Downs and stretch from the London/Surrey borders to the White Cliffs of Dover, including a small section of the London Borough of Bromley. The AONB also includes the Greensand Ridge, a prominent sandstone escarpment which lies south of the chalk escarpment of the North Downs. 

It was first designated as an AONB in July 1968 and covers 878 square km (326 square miles). The AONB's highest point is Toy's Hill, at 250m above sea level, and its boundaries include three main rivers: the Darent, Medway and Stour.

To the west, Surrey Hills AONB adjoins the Kent Downs AONB, and includes a continuation of the North Downs chalk ridge which runs through the Kent Downs, stretching from Farnham to the English Channel and reappearing within the Parc Naturel Régional des Caps et Marais d’Opale in France. High Weald AONB lies to the south east, separated by a distance of just over 2km at Bough Beech Reservoir.

As part of the management of the AONB, Village Design Statements have been adopted by 14 per cent of villages within its boundaries, going on to form part of Supplementary Planning Guidance, recognising the character of the historic landscape and distinctiveness of settlements.

Areas
Among the named parts of the Downs are:
Alkham Valley  a dry valley north-west of Dover;
Blue Bell Hill
Burham Down
Castle Hill
Chartham Downs
Denge Wood
Detling Hill
Elham Valley
Hollingbourne Downs
Knole Park
Lullingstone Country Park
Ranscombe Farm
Samphire Hoe
Summerhouse Hill
Tolsford Hill
Torry Hill
Wye Downs

Walking
The North Downs Way runs through the full length of the AONB, the Stour Valley Walk passes through the east of the AONB, and the Greensand Way to the south of Sevenoaks.

References

External links
Kent Downs photo group on Flickr

Areas of Outstanding Natural Beauty in England
Hills of Kent
Protected areas of Kent
Chalk landforms